Sclerophora is a genus of lichen-forming fungi in the family Coniocybaceae. Largely restricted to temperate latitudes, three of its six known species have been reported in North America.

Species
Sclerophora amabilis 
Sclerophora farinacea 
Sclerophora minima 
Sclerophora pallida 
Sclerophora peronella 
Sclerophora sanguinea

References

Ascomycota
Ascomycota genera
Lichen genera
Taxa described in 1826
Taxa named by François Fulgis Chevallier